The Grand Lodge of Free & Accepted Masons of California, commonly called the Grand Lodge of California, is one of two Masonic Grand Lodges in the state recognized by the United Grand Lodge of England (the other being the Most Worshipful Prince Hall Grand Lodge of California Free & Accepted Masons). The Grand Lodge of California is headquartered in San Francisco, California.

History 
The Grand Lodge of California was established in Sacramento in 1850, a few months before California became a state. A decade later, California Freemasonry had more than 5,000 members, and lodges up and down the state. Many of the leaders of early California counted themselves among its members.

Auditorium 

Its administrative offices are housed in the upper floors of the SF Masonic Auditorium, also known as Nob Hill Masonic Auditorium.

Leadership 
The current Grand Master of Masons in California is Jeff Wilkins, having been elected at the  Annual Communication of the Grand Lodge that took place October –, 2021.

See also 
 List of notable Masonic buildings in California

References

External links  
 
 California Freemason Magazine
 Most Worshipful Prince Hall Grand Lodge of California

1850 establishments in California
Freemasonry in the United States
Masonic buildings in California